In linear algebra and functional analysis, the min-max theorem, or variational theorem, or Courant–Fischer–Weyl min-max principle, is a result that gives a variational characterization of eigenvalues of compact Hermitian operators on Hilbert spaces. It can be viewed as the starting point of many results of similar nature.

This article first discusses the finite-dimensional case and its applications before considering compact operators on infinite-dimensional Hilbert spaces. 
We will see that for compact operators, the proof of the main theorem uses essentially the same idea from the finite-dimensional argument.

In the case that the operator is non-Hermitian, the theorem provides an equivalent characterization of the associated singular values. 
The min-max theorem can be extended to self-adjoint operators that are bounded below.

Matrices 

Let  be a  Hermitian matrix. As with many other variational results on eigenvalues, one considers the Rayleigh–Ritz quotient  defined by

Clearly, the Rayleigh quotient of an eigenvector is its associated eigenvalue. Equivalently, the Rayleigh–Ritz quotient can be replaced by

For Hermitian matrices A, the range of the continuous function RA(x), or f(x), is a compact interval [a, b] of the real line. The maximum b and the minimum a are the largest and smallest eigenvalue of A, respectively. The min-max theorem is a refinement of this fact.

Min-max theorem 

Let  be an  Hermitian matrix with eigenvalues , then

and
,
in particular,

and these bounds are attained when  is an eigenvector of the appropriate eigenvalues.

Also the simpler formulation for the maximal eigenvalue λn is given by: 

Similarly, the minimal eigenvalue λ1 is given by:

Counterexample in the non-Hermitian case 

Let N be the nilpotent matrix

Define the Rayleigh quotient  exactly as above in the Hermitian case. That is, the maximum value of the Rayleigh quotient is larger than the maximum eigenvalue.

Applications

Min-max principle for singular values 

The singular values {σk} of a square matrix M are the square roots of the eigenvalues of M*M (equivalently MM*). An immediate consequence of the first equality in the min-max theorem is:

Similarly,

Here  denotes the kth entry in the increasing sequence of σ's, so that .

Cauchy interlacing theorem 

Let  be a symmetric n × n matrix. The m × m matrix B, where m ≤ n, is called a compression of  if there exists an orthogonal projection P onto a subspace of dimension m such that PAP* = B. The Cauchy interlacing theorem states:

Theorem.

This can be proven using the min-max principle. Let βi have corresponding eigenvector bi and Sj be the j dimensional subspace  then

According to first part of min-max,  On the other hand, if we define  then

where the last inequality is given by the second part of min-max.

When , we have , hence the name interlacing theorem.

Compact operators 

Let  be a compact, Hermitian operator on a Hilbert space H. Recall that the spectrum of such an operator (the set of eigenvalues) is a set of real numbers whose only possible cluster point is zero. 

where entries are repeated with multiplicity, as in the matrix case. (To emphasize that the sequence is decreasing, we may write .) 
When H is infinite-dimensional, the above sequence of eigenvalues is necessarily infinite. 
We now apply the same reasoning as in the matrix case. Letting Sk ⊂ H be a k dimensional subspace, we can obtain the following theorem.

Theorem (Min-Max). Let  be a compact, self-adjoint operator on a Hilbert space , whose positive eigenvalues are listed in decreasing order . Then:

A similar pair of equalities hold for negative eigenvalues.

Self-adjoint operators 

The min-max theorem also applies to (possibly unbounded) self-adjoint operators. Recall the essential spectrum is the spectrum without isolated eigenvalues of finite multiplicity. 
Sometimes we have some eigenvalues below the essential spectrum, and we would like to approximate the eigenvalues and eigenfunctions.

Theorem (Min-Max). Let A be self-adjoint, and let  be the eigenvalues of A below the essential spectrum. Then

.

If we only have N eigenvalues and hence run out of eigenvalues, then we let  (the bottom of the essential spectrum) for n>N, and the above statement holds after replacing min-max with inf-sup.

Theorem (Max-Min). Let A be self-adjoint, and let  be the eigenvalues of A below the essential spectrum. Then

.

If we only have N eigenvalues and hence run out of eigenvalues, then we let  (the bottom of the essential spectrum) for n > N, and the above statement holds after replacing max-min with sup-inf.

The proofs use the following results about self-adjoint operators:

Theorem. Let A be self-adjoint. Then  for  if and only if .

Theorem. If A is self-adjoint, then

and

.

See also 

 Courant minimax principle
 Max–min inequality

References

External links and citations to related work

 
 
 
 

Articles containing proofs
Operator theory
Spectral theory
Theorems in functional analysis